The Ksar Metlili Formation is a geological formation in eastern High Atlas of Morocco, it is late Tithonian to Berriasian in age. One of these calcareous beds near the middle of the sequence is an important microvertebrate locality. Subsequent to the original site, several other localities have been sampled. The depositional environment is thought to be near shore deltaic.

Fossil content

Amphibians

Lepidosaurs

Dinosaurs

Mammals

References 

Geologic formations of Morocco
Jurassic System of Africa
Tithonian Stage
Jurassic Morocco
Upper Cretaceous Series of Africa
Berriasian Stage
Cretaceous Morocco
Sandstone formations
Mudstone formations
Paleontology in Morocco